German submarine U-1104 was a Type VIIC/41 U-boat of Nazi Germany's Kriegsmarine during World War II.

She was ordered on 14 October 1941, and was laid down on 29 June 1943, at Nordseewerke, Emden, as yard number 226. She was launched on 7 December 1943, and commissioned under the command of Oberleutnant zur See Rüdiger Perleberg on 15 March 1944.

Design
German Type VIIC/41 submarines were preceded by the heavier Type VIIC submarines. U-1104 had a displacement of  when at the surface and  while submerged. She had two shafts and two  propellers.

U-1104 was fitted with five  torpedo tubes (four fitted at the bow and one at the stern), fourteen torpedoes or 26 TMA or TMB Naval mines, one  SK C/35 naval gun, (220 rounds), one  Flak M42 and two  C/30 anti-aircraft guns. The boat had a complement of between forty-four and fifty-two.

Service history
On 9 May 1945, U-1104 surrendered at Bergen, Norway and was later transferred to Loch Ryan, Scotland on 30 May 1945. Of the 156 U-boats that eventually surrendered to the Allied forces at the end of the war, U-1104 was one of 116 selected to take part in Operation Deadlight. U-1104 was towed out and sank on 1 December 1945 by naval gunfire.

See also
 Battle of the Atlantic

References

Bibliography

German Type VIIC/41 submarines
U-boats commissioned in 1944
World War II submarines of Germany
1944 ships
Ships built in Emden
Maritime incidents in December 1945
World War II shipwrecks in the Atlantic Ocean
Operation Deadlight